Morabidae is a family of grasshoppers in the order Orthoptera. There are more than 40 genera and 120 described species in Morabidae, found in Australasia.

Genera
These 42 genera belong to the family Morabidae:

 Achuraba Key, 1976
 Achurimima Key, 1976
 Alatiplica Key, 1976
 Aliena Key, 1976
 Amangu Key, 1976
 Aruntina Key, 1976
 Baruca Key, 1976
 Biroella Bolívar, 1903
 Bundinja Key, 1976
 Callimunga Key, 1976
 Callita Key, 1976
 Callitala Sjöstedt, 1921
 Capsigera Key, 1976
 Carnarvonella Key, 1976
 Chinnicka Key, 1976
 Crois Key, 1976
 Culmacris Key, 1976
 Drysdalopila Key, 1977
 Filoraba Key, 1976
 Flindersella Key, 1976
 Furculifera Key, 1976
 Geckomima Key, 1976
 Georgina Key, 1976
 Hastella Key, 1976
 Heide Key, 1976
 Keyacris Rehn, 1952
 Malleolopha Key, 1976
 Micromeeka Key, 1976
 Moraba Walker, 1870
 Moritala Key, 1976
 Namatjira Key, 1976
 Nanihospita Key, 1976
 Prorifera Key, 1976
 Proscopiomima Key, 1976
 Sicula Key, 1976
 Spectriforma Key, 1976
 Stiletta Key, 1976
 Swanea Key, 1976
 Vandiemenella Key, 1976
 Warramaba Key, 1976
 Warramunga Rehn, 1952
 Whiteacris Key, 1976

References

Further reading

 
 

Caelifera